The 1968 PGA Tour season was played from January 11 to November 24. The season consisted of 46 official money events. Billy Casper won the most tournaments, six, and there were 11 first-time winners. Casper was the leading money winner with earnings of $205,169 and also won the Vardon Trophy for the lowest scoring average. The PGA Player of the Year was not awarded.

Schedule
The following table lists official events during the 1968 season.

Unofficial events
The following events were sanctioned by the PGA Tour, but did not carry official money, nor were wins official.

Money leaders
The money list was based on prize money won during the season, calculated in U.S. dollars.

Awards

Notes

References

External links
PGA Tour official site

PGA Tour seasons
PGA Tour